Jean Fabry (6 June 1876 – 1 June 1968) was a French politician. He served in the French Army during World War I, and he became an officer of the Legion of Honour for his service. He served as a member of the Chamber of Deputies from 1919 to 1936, representing Seine. He then served as a member of the French Senate from 1936 to 1945, representing Doubs. He was also Minister of Colonies from 29 March to 14 June 1924, and the Minister of National Defence and War from 30 January to 4 February 1934, and from 7 June 1935 to 24 January 1936. He became a grand officer of the Legion of Honour in 1939.

Works

References

1876 births
1968 deaths
People from Villefranche-de-Rouergue
Politicians from Occitania (administrative region)
Republican and Social Action politicians
Democratic Republican Alliance politicians
Democratic and Social Action politicians
Republican Centre politicians
French Ministers of the Colonies
French Ministers of War and National Defence
Members of the 12th Chamber of Deputies of the French Third Republic
Members of the 13th Chamber of Deputies of the French Third Republic
Members of the 14th Chamber of Deputies of the French Third Republic
Members of the 15th Chamber of Deputies of the French Third Republic
French Senators of the Third Republic
Senators of Doubs
École Spéciale Militaire de Saint-Cyr alumni
French military personnel of World War I
Grand Officiers of the Légion d'honneur